Garcinia subelliptica, commonly known as the happiness or Fukugi tree, is an evergreen tree found in coastal forests of East and Southeast Asia, specifically the Ryukyu Islands of Japan, Taiwan, Philippines, Indonesia, Sri Lanka, and India.

Trees are 6–20 meters high with ovate-oblong or elliptical thick leathery leaves. Fruits are smooth and yellow with 1-4 seeds.

The tree is widely planted in the Ryukyu Islands as a windbreak and ornamental, and the bark is a traditional dye. It is the floral emblem for the towns of Motobu and Tarama.

References

External links

Garcinia Cambogia Benefits

subelliptica
Taxa named by Elmer Drew Merrill